Terry Lester (April 13, 1950 – November 28, 2003) was an American actor. His best known roles include Jack Abbott on The Young and the Restless, Mason Capwell on Santa Barbara and Royce Keller on As the World Turns.

Early life and education 
Lester was born in Indianapolis, Indiana. He graduated from Southport High School and began an acting career while at DePauw University.

Career 
He starred in the 1976 children's series Ark II, followed by roles in Airport 1975 and the 1978 Kiss movie Kiss Meets the Phantom of the Park.

Lester's big break came when he joined CBS daytime soap The Young and the Restless in 1980. He originated the role of Jack Abbott, a scoundrel who never met a woman (including his own father's wife) he didn't want to take to bed. Lester was so popular that The Young and the Restless creator William J. Bell wrote an entire family for him. The series was going through a transition period, and many fans believed his star quality helped the show build more viewership rising to #1 in daytime soap ratings.

In spite of his popularity, by the end of the decade Lester felt his role on the show was steadily declining. In 1989 he not only quit but also went to the daytime press and blamed Bill Bell's young daughter, Lauralee Bell (who played Christine Blair), for his dwindling role. He felt the excess airtime given to her came at the expense of both himself and other actors. Lester was replaced by Peter Bergman, who has played the part of Jack ever since. Lester switched to NBC to take over the role of Mason Capwell on Santa Barbara for a year after Lane Davies left the show permenantly. In November 1992, he joined As the World Turns to play the charming Royce Keller, who was soon revealed to be suffering from multiple personalities which caused him to kill his own sister in the series. The role was complex, causing raves for Lester, but the headwriter behind the story, Douglas Marland, died suddenly in 1993, and Lester once again found his screentime diminishing. He left the series on May 5, 1994.

The remainder of his professional life consisted of appearances in primetime shows such as Walker, Texas Ranger and Star Trek: Voyager along with various tours in musicals and plays.

Filmography

References

External links 

 
 

1950 births
2003 deaths
American male soap opera actors
Place of death missing
American male television actors
DePauw University alumni
American gay actors
Male actors from Indianapolis
20th-century American male actors
20th-century American LGBT people